Opie Otterstad is a painter who specializes in paintings of sports figures and events.  He graduated from St. Olaf College with a bachelor's degree in Studio Art and one in Psychology.  He is the official artist of the Texas Baseball Hall of Fame.

In 2006, he was commissioned by The University of Texas at Austin to create a painting commemorating the 2005 Texas Longhorns football team who won the NCAA Division I-A national football championship. The painting titled The University of Texas National Championship 2005 was unveiled on May 6, 2006.

References

External links
The Art Studio of Opie Otterstad
Art and Bio
Opie Otterstad's art agency

Year of birth missing (living people)
Living people
21st-century American painters
Artists from Texas
St. Olaf College alumni
American male painters